Bangana decora is a species of cyprinid fish endemic to the West River in China.

References

Bangana
Fish described in 1881
Taxa named by Wilhelm Peters